Rickshawala is a 1973 Indian Hindi-language film starring Randhir Kapoor, Neetu Singh and Mala Sinha and directed by K. Shankar and Produced by R M Veerappan under his noted Sathya Movies banner. It was Neetu Singh's first film in lead role. It was remake of the 1971 Tamil film Rickshawkaran.

Cast
Randhir Kapoor as Gopi
Neetu Singh as Kiran
Mala Sinha as Parvati
Pran as Kailash
Mohan Choti as Kabira Rickshaw driver
Anwar Hussain (actor) as Madan
Ranjeet as Murli
Sujit Kumar as Manohar
 Lalita Desai (alias Ashoo) as Shanti
Sunder (actor) as Chacha
Poornam Viswanathan as Chief Justice

Production 
Rickshawala is a remake of the 1971 Tamil film Rickshawkaran, and was Neetu Singh's first film as the lead heroine.

Soundtrack 
The song 'Rampur ka vasi hoon main' is played by the band in wedding procession scene. This song is originally picturized on Randhir Kapoor, in the film 'Rampur ka Laxman (1972), music by RD Burman'

In another scene, the soundtrack of another RD Burman superhit 'Dum maro Dum' is played.

Trivia 
The scene of Madras cycle rickshaw race was shot in Anna nagar area of Madras (now Chennai). The famous Tower of Anna Nagar Tower Park can be seen in the background.

Reception 
Unlike the Tamil original, the remake was a flop.

References

External links 

1973 films
Films scored by R. D. Burman
1970s Hindi-language films
Hindi remakes of Tamil films
Films directed by K. Shankar